Dominique You or Youx (born Frederic You or Youx, c. 1775 – November 15, 1830) was a privateer, soldier, and politician.

Biography
According to information he provided to his masonic lodge in New Orleans, he was born in Cette (now spelled Sète) in Languedoc, France. (Contrary to the spurious Journal of Jean Laffite, he was not the older brother of Pierre and Jean Laffite.) He served as an artilleryman in the French Revolutionary Army. In 1802 he accompanied General Charles Leclerc's expedition to quell Toussaint Louverture's Haitian Revolution.

Following the failure of this expedition, Dominique You managed to reach Louisiana, where it is sometimes alleged thousands of pirates were based at that time. He appears to have joined Jean Lafitte and Pierre Lafitte. He became the captain of the pirate ship Le Pandoure. He was nicknamed "Captain Dominique" by the French and "Johnness" by the Americans. He acquired a reputation for being very bold and daring. During the next few years he and the Lafitte brothers became successful smugglers in the Louisiana bayous. As pirates, they preyed on Spanish ships in the Gulf of Mexico, doing extensive damage to Spanish commerce. On one occasion, a hurricane in the Gulf of Mexico caused severe damage to Le Pandoure and almost killed Captain You.

From 1804, the governor of newly American Louisiana (or "the Territory of Orleans"), William C. C. Claiborne, was making efforts to suppress piracy. In July 1814, Dominique You was publicly identified as a pirate. In September 1814, he was in a pirate camp at Barataria Bay when it was captured by American forces; he was taken prisoner along with other Baratarian pirates. Soon, however, in the context of the ongoing War of 1812, Jean Lafitte had the opportunity to offer to help General Andrew Jackson defend New Orleans against the impending British invasion, in exchange for a pardon for him and his pirate crews. Jackson accepted this offer, and You was appointed commander of a company of artillery which was composed of the Baratarians' best gunners. Compared to the official American forces, the pirates fought particularly well in the Battle of New Orleans on January 8, 1815, and were mentioned in Major General Andrew Jackson's general order of January 21 for having shown uncommon gallantry and skill in the field.

As a result of this success, the charges against the Baratarians and Dominique You were dropped. After the battle, You settled in New Orleans where he became involved in politics as a partisan of Andrew Jackson. You died in New Orleans in 1830, receiving a military funeral at public expense. His grave bears a Freemasonic symbol.

See also
Battle of New Orleans
Jean Lafitte
Letter of marque
Pierre Lafitte
Privateering
Renato Beluche

References

External links

 Dominique You Papers at The Historic New Orleans Collection 

1775 births
1830 deaths
18th-century French people
19th-century French people
19th-century American politicians
19th-century pirates
People from Sète
Politicians from New Orleans
French pirates
Haitian pirates
American pirates
French military personnel of the French Revolutionary Wars
People of the Haitian Revolution
American people of the War of 1812
People of Saint-Domingue
French emigrants to the United States
Louisiana Jacksonians
Battle of New Orleans